Montrouge Cemetery (French: Cimetière de Montrouge) is a cemetery in the south of the 14th arrondissement of Paris, located between the Boulevards of the Marshals and Boulevard Périphérique. It was created in 1819 in the commune of Montrouge, but was transferred to the City of Paris in 1925 following a border change.

Whilst the most visited grave is that of Coluche, there are many other graves of interest, as well as a crypt. Despite being a Parisian cemetery, the influence of Montrouge is noteworthy, most notably through the granite stele commemorating 96 soldiers from Montrouge fallen on World War I battlegrounds.

Selection of personalities buried in the cemetery

References

External links 
 
 Le cimetière de Montrouge, sur le site des amis et passionnés du Père-Lachaise
 

Montrouge
14th arrondissement of Paris
Montrouge